The 2018 Akita Masters (officially known as the Yonex Akita Masters 2018 for sponsorship reasons) was a badminton tournament which took place at CNA Arena Akita in Japan from 24 to 29 July 2018 and had a total purse of $75,000.

Tournament
The 2018 Akita Masters was the fourth Super 100 tournament of the 2018 BWF World Tour and also part of the Akita Masters championships, which was held for the first time. This tournament was organized by the Nippon Badminton Association with the sanction from the BWF.

Venue
This international tournament was held at CNA Arena Akita in Akita, Akita Prefecture, Japan.

Point distribution
Below is the point distribution table for each phase of the tournament based on the BWF points system for BWF Tour Super 100 events.

Prize money
The total prize money for this year's tournament was US$75,000. Distribution of prize money was in accordance with BWF regulations.

Men's singles

Seeds

 Kanta Tsuneyama (withdrew)
 Ihsan Maulana Mustofa (final)
 Lu Guangzu (second round)
 Lin Yu-hsien (second round)
 Jan Ø. Jørgensen (semi-finals)
 Panji Ahmad Maulana (third round)
 Yu Igarashi (semi-finals)
 Sitthikom Thammasin (champion)

Finals

Top half

Section 1

Section 2

Bottom half

Section 3

Section 4

Women's singles

Seeds

 Sayaka Takahashi (champion)
 Minatsu Mitani (second round)
 Sung Shuo-yun (first round)
 Saena Kawakami (quarter-finals)
 Brittney Tam (first round)
 Lyanny Alessandra Mainaky (first round)
 Shiori Saito (quarter-finals)
 Haruko Suzuki (second round)

Finals

Top half

Section 1

Section 2

Bottom half

Section 3

Section 4

Men's doubles

Seeds

 Jason Ho-shue / Nyl Yakura (second round)
 Inkarat Apisuk / Tanupat Viriyangkura (semi-finals)
 Sabar Karyaman Gutama / Frengky Wijaya Putra (withdrew)
 Po Li-wei / Yang Ming-tse (second round)

Finals

Top half

Section 1

Section 2

Bottom half

Section 3

Section 4

Women's doubles

Seeds

 Naoko Fukuman / Kurumi Yonao (quarter-finals)
 Ayako Sakuramoto / Yukiko Takahata (champions)
 Savitree Amitrapai / Pacharapun Chochuwong (second round)
 Misato Aratama / Akane Watanabe (second round)

Finals

Top half

Section 1

Section 2

Bottom half

Section 3

Section 4

Mixed doubles

Seeds

 Chang Ko-chi / Cheng Chi-ya (semi-finals)
 Kim Hwi-tae / Kim Hye-jeong (first round)
 Akbar Bintang Cahyono / Winny Oktavina Kandow (quarter-finals)
 Danny Bawa Chrisnanta / Crystal Wong (quarter-finals)

Finals

Top half

Section 1

Section 2

Bottom half

Section 3

Section 4

References

External links
 Tournament Link

Akita Masters
Akita Masters
Akita Masters
Sport in Akita Prefecture
July 2018 sports events in Japan